"Thorn in My Side" is a song by British pop music duo Eurythmics. It was released as the second single from the duo's fifth studio album, Revenge (1986). Written by band members Annie Lennox and David A. Stewart, the song is a cast-off to an unfaithful lover. "Thorn in My Side" was produced by Stewart.

Background
Although the first single from Revenge, "When Tomorrow Comes", had barely reached the UK Top 30, "Thorn in My Side" became Eurythmics' ninth Top 10 single, reaching number five on the UK Singles Chart and marking their last appearance in the UK top 10. In the United States, the track stalled at number 68 on the Billboard Hot 100. The song additionally peaked at number two in Ireland and reached the top 10 in New Zealand (number seven) and Sweden (number six).

Reception
Billboard said it sounds like "Swinging London, 1964" although it "views the past with as much irony as affection."  Cash Box called it an "appealing pop/rock single" in which the "seething lyrics are masked by an infectious melody and Annie Lennox’s winning vocal."

Music video
The music video, directed by Chris Ashbrook and Dave Stewart, depicts the band adorned in their black and leather Revenge stage costumes, playing in a studio set bar filled with an audience that includes a gang of Hells Angels. Clem Burke, drummer from the band Blondie, appears in the video as he was recording and touring with Eurythmics that year. It was also the second music video to feature backing vocalist Joniece Jamison, after first appearing in "When Tomorrow Comes".

Track listings
7-inch single
A. "Thorn in My Side" (album version) – 4:07
B. "When Tomorrow Comes" (live at the Roxy in Los Angeles) – 5:02

12-inch single
A1. "Thorn in My Side" (extended mix) – 6:54
B1. "Thorn in My Side" (album version) – 4:07
B2. "When Tomorrow Comes" (live at the Roxy in Los Angeles) – 5:02

12-inch single (Houston remix)
A1. "Thorn in My Side" (Houston remix) – 5:49
B1. "Thorn in My Side" (album version) – 4:07
B2. "In This Town" (live)

Charts

Weekly charts

Year-end charts

References

External links
YouTube - "Thorn in My Side" video

1986 songs
1986 singles
Eurythmics songs
RCA Records singles
Songs written by David A. Stewart
Songs written by Annie Lennox
Song recordings produced by Dave Stewart (musician and producer)